The Boarding House was a music and comedy nightclub, located at 960 Bush Street in San Francisco, California, opened by David Allen in 1971 and closed in the early 1980s. Many comedians launched their career at the boarding house including Robin Williams. Steve Martin's first three albums were recorded there, Let's Get Small, A Wild and Crazy Guy, and Comedy Is Not Pretty!, in whole or in part. Ellen DeGeneres and Jay Leno have said they first met at The Boarding House.

The club was also host to a multitude of musical acts, such as Jerry Garcia, Dire Straits, Dolly Parton, Patti Smith, Neil Young, Bette Midler, Billy Joel, Bob Marley and the Wailers, Mason Williams, The Tubes, Talking Heads, Old & In the Way, Randy Newman, Dan Hicks & His Hot Licks, Jim Croce, Harry Chapin, Hoyt Axton, Camel, and Tom Waits. The Residents also first played there.

Pre-history and David Allen

Before opening the Boarding House in 1971, New Jersey-born David Allen had operated a target range on the top floor of California Hall on Polk Street, and performed as a repertory theater actor and as KPIX's "Deputy Dave."  In the 1960s, he worked with Enrico Banducci at the hungry i and helped nurture the careers of Barbra Streisand and Lenny Bruce.  After he opened The Boarding House in 1971, he helped launch many noted comedians and musicians of the 1970s and 80s by booking them early in their career.

Entertainers and writers have noted that Allen was "genial", "loved and respected" but frequently in financial difficulties and often kept The Boarding House running "on charm alone," relying on benefits performed by stars whose careers he had launched.

Bush Street location

History

Previous to the 1906 earthquake, the address was an apartment building called The Cecil. After the earthquake and resulting fire, it was rebuilt as The Fitzgerald Memorial Methodist Episcopal Church and opened 25 August 1918; it ceased operation as a church in 1931 and re-opened 8 September 1931 as the Fine Arts Building and Auditorium. It was known by many names over the years, beginning with the Kamokila (1 June 1933), and the Royal Hawaiian Club (25 April 1935). From 5 March 1936 until 1939 it also housed the Federal Theatre, later known as the Federal Workshop. In 1942 it re-opened as Shangri La, and on 8 March 1943 it became the Bush Street Music Hall, the home of the perennially popular melodrama, The Drunkard, produced by Barry Breden. From March 1947 until January 1955 it operated as the Balalaika, and on 10 January 1950 became known as the Bush Street Theatre, home of the San Francisco Repertory Company; from 27 June 1956 until July 1960, it was Fack's II, and re-opened 26 September 1960 as Neve of SF; it was the Theatre Lab in 1966, and re-opened as The Quake 31 December 1967. It re-opened again as The Troubadour (North) 4 August 1970, owned by Doug Weston, who also owned the Hollywood folk and rock institution, The Troubadour. , finally becoming The Boarding House 21 February 1973.

Media coverage

The club was featured in Billboard in 1974 and by 1977, the same magazine called it "the city's top nightclub for major name entertainment." Robin Williams described David Allen and Bay Area entertainment reviewer John Wasserman as "like a team".  "David would find these strange unique talents and John's reviews would get people in."

Columbus Street location and closure

After a disastrous fire, the Bush Street building was torn down in July 1980 and replaced by condominiums.

Dave Allen reopened the club for a short time at 901 Columbus Ave in the city's North Beach district, where comedians Robin Williams, Lily Tomlin and Paula Poundstone performed. The club had closed by 1982; Allen died on May 25, 1984.

References

External links
Boardinghouse, San Francisco, CA, USA Concert Setlists - setlist.fm
 Boarding House, 960 Bush St., San Francisco, CA - Jerry's Brokendown Palaces
December 12-13, 1974: The Boarding House, Garcia and Saunders (canceled) - Lost Live Dead
The Boarding House - Discogs
Boarding House - rocktourdatabase.com
San Francisco, the Musical History Tour By Joel Selvin
Venue: The Boarding House - Rate Your Music
Berkeley Barb June 18-24, 1971 — Independent Voices
Berkeley Barb Jan. 18-24, 1974 — Independent Voices

Nightclubs in San Francisco
Culture of San Francisco
Music venues in the San Francisco Bay Area
Former music venues in California
Comedy clubs in California
Demolished buildings and structures in San Francisco
Buildings and structures demolished in 1980
Defunct nightclubs in California